Hans-Jürgen Rückborn (born 8 October 1940) is a German athlete. He competed in the men's triple jump at the 1964 Summer Olympics.

References

External links
 

1940 births
Living people
Athletes (track and field) at the 1964 Summer Olympics
German male triple jumpers
Olympic athletes of the United Team of Germany
People from Stendal
Sportspeople from Saxony-Anhalt